The Aabach is a small river that runs through the Swiss cantons of Lucerne and Aargau, in the Aare catchment area. It flows from south to north through the valley called Seetal (lit.: Lake Valley) and ends in the Aare.

Course

The Aabach has its origin in Lake Baldegg, which is fed by the Ron and a number of smaller streams. In the village of Mosen it empties into Lake Hallwil (the Hallwilersee). The Aabach leaves the lake between the villages of Boniswil and Seengen.

On the southern outskirts of Lenzburg a tunnel takes much of the flow of the Aabach under the town to rejoin the river in Niederlenz township. It was built as a relief tunnel to mitigate flooding in the town, which had been occasionally severe during the spring runoff.

Economy
Beginning in the second half of the 18th century, the Aabach provided water-power that ran mills that led to the creation of industry in the valley. these included the cotton-mill in Seon, the copper wire works in Wildegg, the Hämmerli arms factory in Lenzburg, and the Wisa-Gloria works in Lenzburg.

Notes

References

 

Rivers of Switzerland
Rivers of Aargau
Rivers of the canton of Lucerne